Mandalika may refer to:
 Mandalika I, Chudasama king, reigned 1294–1306 CE
 Mandalika II, Chudasama king, reigned 1397–1400 CE
 Mandalika III, Chudasama king, reigned 1451–1472 CE
 Mandalika International Street Circuit, a circuit in the island of Lombok, Indonesia
 Mandalika (resort area), a resort area in the island of Lombok, Indonesia
 Mandalika Island, a small island in Java Sea, Indonesia
 Princess Mandalika, whose drowning and reincarnation is commemorated in the Nyale Festival on Lombok, Indonesia